The Lee Highway was a national auto trail in the United States, connecting New York City and San Francisco, California, via the South and Southwest. After receiving a letter on January 15, 1919, from Dr. Samuel Myrtle Johnson of Roswell, New Mexico, David Carlisle Humphreys of Lexington, Virginia, put out a call for a meeting in Roanoke, Virginia, to form a new national highway association. On December 3, 1919, five hundred men from five states met in Roanoke to officially form the Lee Highway Association. The auto trail was named after Robert E. Lee.

From the memoirs of Katherine Johnson Balcomb (April 3, 1894 — February 2, 1980), published in The Balcomb Family Tree Book:

Routing
The route of the Lee Highway is now roughly designated by the following routes:
 US 1: New York to Washington, D.C.
 US 29: Key Bridge from Washington to Rosslyn, Virginia
US 29: traversing Arlington County, Virginia, where it carries the name Langston Boulevard. In July 2021, the Arlington County Board voted to change the name from Lee Highway to Langston Boulevard, after John Mercer Langston, the first African American elected to Congress from Virginia. Installation of signs with the new name was reported to be near completion in October 2021.
 US 29: through Falls Church, Virginia, where it carries the names North Washington Street and South Washington Street.
 US 29: bearing the name Lee Highway in Fairfax County, Virginia, to its intersection with US 50/Arlington Boulevard in Fairfax City.
 US 29/US 50: bearing the name Fairfax Boulevard within Fairfax City, Virginia (formerly Lee Highway).
 US 29: bearing the name Lee Highway from the intersection with Main Street in Fairfax City to Warrenton, Virginia.
 US 211: Warrenton to New Market, Virginia
 US 11: New Market to Bristol, Virginia
 US 11W: Bristol to Knoxville, Tennessee
 US 11: Knoxville to Chattanooga, Tennessee
 US 72: Chattanooga to Corinth, Mississippi
 US 45, Corinth to Selmer, Tennessee
 US 64, Selmer to Memphis, Tennessee
 US 70, Memphis to Alamogordo, New Mexico
 US 54, Alamogordo to El Paso, Texas
 US 180, El Paso to Las Cruces, New Mexico
 US 70, Las Cruces to Globe, Arizona
 US 60, Globe to Phoenix, Arizona
 Arizona SR 85 (former US 80) and Old US 80, Phoenix to Gila Bend, Arizona
 I-8 (former US 80), Gila Bend to San Diego, California
 I-5 (former US 101), San Diego to Los Angeles, California
 US 101, Los Angeles to San Francisco, California

Present day name usage
Much of the original route is still known by the name "Lee Highway". The following cities and areas of the U.S. (listed from East to West) still have roads that use the name:

 Virginia
 The Lee Highway was defined by the General Assembly on March 20, 1922, to run from the District of Columbia at the Francis Scott Key Bridge to Bristol at the border with Tennessee. This was defined as U.S. Route 211 and U.S. Route 11 in 1926; US 211 northeast of Warrenton is now U.S. Route 29. It now uses the following business routes:
 U.S. Route 29 Business and U.S. Route 211 Business in Warrenton
 U.S. Route 211 Business in Washington
 U.S. Route 211 Business in Luray
 U.S. Route 11 Business in Staunton
 U.S. Route 11 Business in Lexington
 The portion of US 11 known as Apperson Drive in Salem, Virginia, and Brandon Avenue SW in Roanoke, Virginia, is also commonly called Lee Highway. Other sections of US 11 in the Roanoke Valley are not typically referred to as Lee Highway. In the county of Botetourt, US 11 transitions from Williamson Road to Lee Highway and is thus named at least until Buchanan, Virginia
 Tennessee
 East Tennessee (US 11 from Chattanooga to Dixie Lee Junction)
 Cleveland, Tennessee
 Chattanooga, Tennessee
 South Pittsburg, Tennessee
 Huntsville, Alabama
 Florence, Alabama
 Corinth, Mississippi

Cultural references
The "Lee Highway Blues" is a standard of southern string band music, widely attributed to G. B. Grayson of the popular Grayson and Whitter string band of the late 1920s, who recorded it under the title "Going Down The Lee Highway" but almost certainly composed by fiddler James ("Uncle Jimmy" or "Fiddlin' Jim") McCarroll of the Roane County Ramblers.  The tune has been used as a fiddler's showpiece especially in the Virginia area by well-known fiddlers, notably Scotty Stoneman (who referred to it as Talkin' Fiddle Blues), and by string band revivalists such as the Highwoods String Band.

For an outstanding rendition of Lee Highway Blues see CMH Records, Inc., CD9037, artist: Chubby Wise. Lee Highway Blues was also recorded on Pioneering Women of Bluegrass, Alice Gerrard & Hazel Dickens; this album is in the Smithsonian collection.

David Bromberg wrote and performs a whimsical bluegrass tune, "The New Lee Highway Blues", describing the tribulations of traveling on an endless highway of one horse towns.

Also, fiddler Ken Clark performed a tune called Lee Highway Ramble.

Notes

References
 Rand McNally Auto Road Atlas, 1926, accessed via the Broer Map Library: shows the route between Washington, D.C. and New Mexico, except in western Tennessee
 Virginia Hart, The Story of American Roads, 1950, p. 240: lists the cities on the route

External links
 The Lee Highway - AmericanRoads.us
 United States Route 80 The Dixie Overland Highway - FHWA
 Dr. S. M. Johnson - A Dreamer of Dreams - FHWA
 Dr. S. M. Johnson Photo Gallery Along Lee Highway (Mid-1920s) - FHWA
 My Grandfather's Lee Highway - HFCI

Auto trails in the United States
Monuments and memorials to Robert E. Lee